The Last Patriot is a thriller written by American novelist Brad Thor. It tells the story of counter-terrorism agent Scot Harvath's attempts to uncover a revelation that could damage the standing of Islamic extremism. In the book's plot, the Islamic prophet Muhammed is depicted as having been assassinated by his followers to conceal a damaging secret. Twelve centuries later, Thomas Jefferson unearths the mystery and leaves clues for future searchers to follow. Harvath attempts to unravel the truth about Muhammed's ultimate epiphany in the face of deadly resistance from those with an intent to keeping it suppressed.

The novel was a number-one New York Times Bestseller. The book was nominated for "Best Thriller of the Year 2008" by The International Thriller Writers Association.

References

2008 American novels
American thriller novels
Cultural depictions of Muhammad
Cultural depictions of Thomas Jefferson
Islam in fiction
Simon & Schuster books